Nim Him is a 2020 Sri Lankan Sinhala romantic drama film directed by Mitchell Fonseka and co-produced by director himself with Saman Dharmawansha, Gayan Gunawardana, Pradeep Herath, Indika Madawala and Prince Wickramanayake for Ama Films and Alankara Films. It stars Gangu Roshana and Milinda Madugalle in lead roles along with Janak Premalal and Kumari Munasinghe. Music composed by Sarath Wickrama.

Production
This movie was made about five years ago. It usually takes a year and a half to complete and screen the film. The film has been shot in and around Nuwara Eliya, Kurunegala and Colombo. It was released on 6 February 2020 in MPI film theaters across the country with both Sinhala and Tamil languages.

The premiere screening of the film was held at NFC Tharangani Theater in October 2019. The film announced to be released on 15 May 2021. But due to the COVID-19 epidemic, the film could not be screened twice. Finally, the production crew had planned to show it on 13 May 2021. At that time the country was locked down again. Then the film was re-released on 9 December 2021 for the second time.

Plot

Cast
 Gangu Roshana as Radhika Krishnaswami		 
 Milinda Madugalle		
 Janak Premalal		
 Kumari Munasinghe		
 Nirosha Thalagala		
 W. Jayasiri		
 Gihan Fernando		
 Roshan Pilapitiya
 Nilusha Fernando
 Anura Bandara Rajaguru
 Wasantha Vittachchi
 Susanga Kahandawala
 Saman Dharmawansha

References

External links
 
 Him Him on YouTube

2020 films
2020s Sinhala-language films